Bettridge is an English surname. Notable people with the surname include:

 Ed Bettridge, American football player
 John Bettridge, American football player
 Walter Bettridge, British footballer
 Jennens and Bettridge
 William Craddock Bettridge

English-language surnames